Shamániac is the second and final studio album by Finnish folk metal band Shaman, before they changed their name to Korpiklaani. The album has been produced by the Shaman frontman Jonne Järvelä and Samu Ruotsalainen, the drummer of the Finnish folk metal band Finntroll.

Track listing
All songs written by Jonne Järvelä.

 "Mu sieiddi beales mun gottan (Kanöhta lávlla / Álihasta / Mu sieiddi beales mun gottan)" – 17:33
 "Ii lea voibmi" – 3:30
 "Shamániac" – 4:10
 "Jalla" – 4:44
 "Sugađit" – 8:28
 "Duoddarhálti" – 4:49
 "Vuola lávlla" – 2:45

Personnel
 Jonne Järvelä – vocals, yoik, electric and acoustic guitars, shaman drum
 Janne G'thau – bass
 Hosse Latvala – drums, percussion
 Veera Muhli – keyboards
 Toni Nãykki – guitars
 Samu Ruotsalainen – drums, additional bass

Korpiklaani albums
2002 albums